Sucker for Love may refer to:

 Sucker for Love: First Date, a 2022 horror/comedy visual novel
 Sucker for Love (song), a 2010 single